Põhjarannik is a newspaper published in Estonia.

References

Newspapers published in Estonia
Ida-Viru County